The Patriotic Movement for Safeguard and Restoration (MPSR) has been the ruling military junta of Burkina Faso since the January 2022 Burkina Faso coup d'état. Originally it was led by Paul-Henri Sandaogo Damiba, but he was overthrown by dissatisfied junta members during the September 2022 Burkina Faso coup d'état. In his place, Capt. Ibrahim Traoré was installed as the leading figure. By November 2022, aside of Traoré, no other MPSR members were known to the public.

Members
 Ibrahim Traoré
 Paul-Henri Sandaogo Damiba (formerly)

References

2022 establishments in Burkina Faso
Politics of Burkina Faso
Political organisations based in Burkina Faso
Military dictatorships
Current governments